Stoneman's raid may refer to:

 Stoneman's 1863 raid, a cavalry operation in Spotsylvania County that preceded the start of the Battle of Chancellorsville in the American Civil War
 Stoneman's 1864 raid, an expedition into southwest Virginia involving both cavalry and infantry in the American Civil War 
 Stoneman's 1865 raid, a cavalry raid that occurred in parts of Tennessee, North Carolina, and Virginia near the end of the American Civil War

See also
George Stoneman